Fredrick Johnson (born 1878) was an English footballer who played in the Football League for Stoke.

Career
Johnson joined Stoke from local side Stoke St. Peters when, at just 12 years old, he was involved in a 44–0 victory over Bucknall St. Mary's. He was a speedy winger and made his debut in the 1895–96 season where he played in nine matches scoring once. In 1897–98 Stoke struggled throughout the campaign and finished in bottom place. They entered the end of season test matches with Newcastle United and Burnley Johnson played in all four matches including the final match against Burnley where both teams went into the match knowing that a draw would see them remain in the First Division and throughout the 90 minutes not a single attempt on goal was made, this led to the introduction of automatic promotion and relegation.

Stoke had a far better 1898–99 season as they reached the semi final of the FA Cup for the first time in their history, losing 3–1 to Derby County. He enjoyed his most productive season in 1900–01 where he played in every match. He remained with Stoke until his retirement in 1903 after playing 194 matches scoring 20 goals.

Career statistics

References

English footballers
Stoke City F.C. players
English Football League players
1877 births
Year of death missing
Association football wingers